Nikola Perlić (4 February 1912 – 19 January 1986) was a Yugoslavian footballer who played in top league clubs in Yugoslavia and France, and played for the Yugoslav national team.

Club career
Born in Slavonski Brod, Austro-Hungary (nowadays Croatia), Perlić was not tall but strong and reliable, playing either as an attacking midfielder or a winger, remembered by strong and effective shots from mid-distance.  His playing style was characterised as simple and rational, pressing always the ball and fighting all over the field.  He is among the players with longest playing careers at that period: 25 years.

Perlić started playing in the youth team of local club ŠK Proleter. He moved to a major local club, NK Marsonia, where he became senior and played between 1927 and 1933.  In 1933 he moved to the national capital, Belgrade, and signed with one of the major Yugoslav clubs, SK Jugoslavija.  His good exhibitions will make him with Jugoslavija will earn him 3 calls for the Belgrade representative team (it was usual at that time major cities to have their own selections), and later in 1936 his first call to the national team.

In 1937 Perlić moved to France and played one season with Lille OSC in the Ligue 1. The following year he returned to SK Jugoslavija and played further two seasons in the Yugoslav National Championship. In August 1940 he moved to ŠK Bata Borovo and played with them in the 1940–41 Serbian League.  However at the end of the season the Second World War started and the Yugoslav football was reorganised.  During the war, Nikola Perlić would be twice imprisoned for his resistance activities. He would appear again in the football fields after the war ended, wearing again the colors of Borovo, now renamed into Slaven Borovo.  He will stay in Borovo until 1953 finishing his career at the impressive age of 41.

International career
His debut for the Yugoslav national team was on 6 September 1936, in a 9:3 win in a friendly match against Poland in Belgrade.  His fairway match was on 12 November 1939, in a 0:2 loss against Hungary in Belgrade.  In between Perlić made a total of 8 appearances and scored 3 goals. His highlight at the national team occurred on 18 May 1939, when he scored the winning goal against England in a 2:1 victory in Belgrade.

Personal life
After retiring Perlić became a tailor.  He died on 19 January 1986, in Borovo (SR Croatia, SFR Yugoslavia).

References

External links
 

1912 births
1986 deaths
Sportspeople from Slavonski Brod
Association football midfielders
Yugoslav footballers
Yugoslavia international footballers
NK Marsonia players
SK Jugoslavija players
Lille OSC players
HNK Borovo players
Yugoslav First League players
Ligue 1 players
Yugoslav expatriate footballers
Expatriate footballers in France
Yugoslav expatriate sportspeople in France